Arne Hamarsland (born 24 July 1933) is a Norwegian middle distance runner who specialized in 1500 metres. He represented IL Gular.

At the 1960 Summer Olympics he finished ninth in the 1500 m final in 3:45.0 minutes. He also competed at the 1958 European Championships without reaching the final. He became Norwegian champion in 800 m in 1960 and 1961  and in 1500 m in the years 1955-1956, 1959-1961 and 1963.

He has represented the Centre Party for eight years in Ytrebygda borough council, and chaired Bergen Sports Council from 1997 to 1998.

Personal bests
800 metres - 1:49.1 min (1958) 
1500 metres - 3:39.8 min (1958) - twelfth among Norwegian 1500 m runners.

References

1933 births
Living people
Sportspeople from Bergen
Norwegian male middle-distance runners
Athletes (track and field) at the 1960 Summer Olympics
Olympic athletes of Norway
Politicians from Bergen
Centre Party (Norway) politicians
Norwegian sportsperson-politicians